Deji Plaza is an upscale office and shopping mall complex in Xinjiekou, Nanjing, Jiangsu Province.

The shopping mall is one of the largest in Nanjing and features flagship stores of numerous luxurious brands, including Gucci, Yves Saint Laurent, Louis Vuitton, Bvlgari, Cartier, Dior, Hermes, Chanel, prada, Tiffany & Co., among others. It also include an Ice Rink and an IMAX theatre.

References

Skyscraper office buildings in Nanjing
Buildings and structures under construction in China
Shopping malls in Nanjing
Skyscrapers in Nanjing